Frank Hubbard Powers (September 25, 1864 – November 15, 1920), served in the California State Assembly for the 41st district from 1895 to 1897. He was a San Francisco attorney for Heller & Powers. He and real estate developer James Franklin Devendorf (1856-1934), founded the Carmel Development Company in 1902. They established an art colony that became Carmel-by-the-Sea, California, which included the Carmel Highlands, California.

Early life 

Powers was born in  Campo Seco, Calaveras County, California, on September 25, 1864. He was the son of Aaron Huubard Powers (1829-1907) and Emma Louisa Sweasey (1883-1902), pioneers of the 1849 gold rush. He was educated at the public schools in Sacramento, California and the University of California, Berkeley.

On May 29, 1884, at the University of California, Berkeley, Colonel, Frank H. Powers was in the National Guard of California (N.G.C.) military commission as a member of the graduating class.

On October 15, 1891, Powers married Jane Maria Gallatin (1869-1944) in Manhattan, New York City. She was the daughter of a Sacramento financier, Albert Gallatin (1835-1905). The Victorian house where she grew up in Sacramento was later owned by the father of journalist Lincoln Steffens, and it became the California Governor's Mansion in 1903.

They were at the Thorndike Hotel in Boston, Massachusetts before they returned to San Francisco by way of Cuba and the Southern Pacfic railroad. He was brother-in-law of novelist and explorer Ernest Thompson Seton.

In 1891, Powers was the author of the novel I Swear, a story of a Stockton, California girl in Boston, published by "Vires Publishing Company."

Professional background

Attorney

While he was a law student he held the rank of Colonel in the N.G.C through his commission as a student of the University of California. In 1886, he was admitted to the bar in Sacramento. After practicing law in Sacramento and Stockton, California for several years he went to San Francisco and formed a law partnership with J. H. Young called Young & Powers. He then went into the law firm of Heller & Powers in 1896. When Sidney M. Ehrman, joined the firm in 1905, the firm changed to Heller Powers & Ehrman.

Politician

Powers was a member of the California State Assembly for the 41st district from January 7, 1895, to January 4, 1897. He ran on the Republican ticket and was a Republican for most of his life. He was nominated by Republicans who wanted to secure the adoption of some needed amendments to the Mechanic's lien law.

Carmel Development Company

In 1899, Powers and his wife, Jane, acquired a piece of land in Carmel in lieu of cash for legal fees.

In 1902, real estate developer James Franklin Devendorf (1856-1934) purchased land in Carmel from developer and real estate agent Santiago J. Duckworth, who in 1889, wanted to build a Catholic summer resort. On November 25, 1902, Powers became partners with Devendorf and formed the Carmel Development Company to operate at the Carmel Development Company Building in the town of Carmel-by-the-Sea. Powers provided the capital and did the legal work of the corporation. Devendorf was the general manager on the lots. Powers and Devendorf held title to over 1,600 lots in Carmel.

In September 1903, Powers traveled to Washington D.C., to make Carmel the official post office for the area. On October 5, 1905, Frank and Jane helped form the first free library in Carmel called the Carmel Free Library Association (now the Harrison Memorial Library). Carmelites donated one dollar a year for library use. Frank would come down from San Francisco on weekends to be with his wife and family. After the 1906 San Francisco earthquake, she encouraged her art friends to move to Carmel.

Powers and Devendorf donated the site that would become the Carmel Forest Theater. They were often found there involved in a production of a play.

Powers was interested in the preservation of the California missions and made efforts to the conservation of the Carmel Mission by repreenting the US government at the centenary celebration of Padre Junípero Serra on the Island of Mallorca, Spain in 1913. In April 1903, Powers wrote a letter to the editor of the San Francisco Examiner saying that he, along with William Randolph Hearst, was willing to contribute to the Fund for the Preservation of California's Landmarks. He said: "I think that all the old missions and other buildings should be restored and preserved as monuments to the founders. I am ready to furnish the adobe and the tiling for restoration of that mission in proper form, and for $3,000, I believe that all the adobe and all the tiling for the mission buildings coul be furnished. I am going to do my little towards preserving a relic of early days in this State by preserving an old style farm house in Monterey."

Murphey's barn/studio

By 1904, Powers purchased the Murphy's Barn and farmhouse at the Carmel beachfront, off San Antonio Avenue, between 2nd and 4th Avenues, which still exists today. The land was originally purchased by Irish pioneer Matthew M. Murphey, a sea captain from Boston. Mathew's nephew John Monroe Murphy and his wife, Ann Murphy, built a farmhouse on the land ca. 1870.  

In 1903, the farmhouse was used as the first art studio in Carmel for his artist-wife, Jane Powers, who helped found the Carmel Arts and Crafts Club in 1905. She is credited with bringing other artists to Carmel and developing it into an art colony. Powers called it "The Dunes" and completely restored it in 1907.

Powers was a member of the Zeta Psi fraternity, the San Francisco Bohemian Club, University Club, Commonwealth Club of California, the Society of California, and the Masonic fraternity. Powers and Devendorf spent time in San Francisco to recruit the Bohemian artists and writers.

Death

Powers died on November 15, 1920, at the age of 56, at his home in San Francisco. He was still a member of the Heller & Powers at the time of his death. Funeral service were held in N. Gray and Company funeral home. Cremation was at the Cypress Lawn Memorial Park in Colma, California.

See also
 California's 41st State Assembly district
 List of Bohemian Club members

References

External links

 Carmel Heritage website
 The Carmel Monterey Peninsula Art Colony: A History
 Carmel Historic Preservation
 Audio recording of about Jane Gallatin Powers

1864 births
1920 deaths
People from Carmel-by-the-Sea, California
People from Calaveras County, California
Republican Party members of the California State Assembly
19th-century American politicians